The UC Irvine Anteaters baseball team is the varsity intercollegiate baseball program of the University of California, Irvine. The team's home venue is Cicerone Field at Anteater Ballpark located on campus in Irvine, California. UC Irvine baseball has been a member of the NCAA Division I Big West Conference since the start of the 2002 season which was the Anteaters' first season of play following the university's decision to revive its baseball program after the sport had been dropped following the 1992 season.

The Anteaters won the College Division national championship in 1973 and the Division II national championship in 1974. Since moving to Division I play they have appeared in the NCAA Tournament nine times and the College World Series twice.

History

College Division/Division II
The program was founded prior to the 1970 season and initially played as an independent school in the NCAA College Division, made up of small-school athletic programs.  Under head coach Gary Adams, the team qualified for the College Division Tournament in 1970, 1971, and 1972.  In 1973, the team ended the regular season with a twelve-game winning streak and again qualified for the tournament.  After advancing to the College Division Championship, it defeated Missouri-St. Louis, Eastern Illinois, and Ithaca twice to win a national championship.

In August 1973, the NCAA reorganized its divisions.  Prior to then, the NCAA had competed in two divisions, a large-school University Division and a small-school College Division.  Following the reorganization, the University Division became Division I, while the College Division split into Division II and Division III.  UC Irvine, formerly an independent in the College Division, became a Division II Independent.

In the first season of Division II, the team again won its regional tournament to advance to the Division II Championship.  There, the program defeated New Orleans to win its second consecutive national championship.  Following the 1974 season, Gary Adams left UC Irvine to become the head coach at UCLA.

UC Irvine continued to play in Division II until following the 1977 season, though it did not qualify for another NCAA Tournament.

Transition to Division I
Prior to the 1978 season, the program joined the newly formed Division I Southern California Baseball Association (SCBA).  Former Gonzaga head coach Steve Hertz became the program's head coach prior to the 1979 season, in which the team finished 7th in the SCBA.  In 1980, UC Irvine finished second behind Cal State Fullerton, its best season in the SCBA.

When Steve Hertz returned to Gonzaga following the 1980 season, Mike Gerakos became the program's head coach.  The team continued to play in the SCBA, though it finished no higher than third until the conference disbanded following the 1984 season.  UC Irvine then became members of the Pacific Coast Athletic Association, which was renamed the Big West Conference prior to the 1987 season.  UC Irvine had a winning conference record only twice in eight PCAA/Big West seasons through the end of the 1992 season.

Following the 1992 season, state budget cuts caused the university to cut several sports programs, including baseball.  At the time it was discontinued, the program had a 643-565-17 record.

Program revival
In 2000, the university announced plans to revive the varsity baseball program and build a multimillion-dollar on-campus venue for the program.  Following the 2000 college baseball season, the school hired USC assistant John Savage as the program's new head coach.  The team began play in 2002.  Its first game, also the opening of the newly built Anteater Ballpark, was an 8-5 loss to San Diego on January 25, 2002.

In 2004, the team qualified for the NCAA Tournament, its first in Division I.  In the South Bend Regional, the team lost consecutive games to Arizona and Notre Dame and was eliminated.

Following the 2004 season, John Savage left the program to become the head coach at UCLA.  UC Irvine hired Cal State Fullerton assistant coach Dave Serrano to replace him.  In 2006, Serrano's second season, the team qualified for the NCAA Tournament.  In 2007, the team again qualified for the tournament.  After defeating Texas in the Round Rock Regional finals, the Anteaters defeated Wichita State in the Super Regionals to advance to the 2007 College World Series.  At the World Series, the team went 2-2 and was eliminated by eventual national champion Oregon State.

Following the 2007 season, Dave Serrano returned to Cal State Fullerton to become the team's head coach.  He was replaced by former USC head coach Mike Gillespie.  The team qualified for the NCAA Tournament in each of Gillespie's first four seasons (2008-2011).  In 2008, the team was eliminated by LSU in the Super Regional round.  In the team's 2009 season, the Anteaters won the Big West Championship with a 22-2 conference record and qualified for the NCAA Tournament as the #6 National Seed.  It hosted an NCAA Regional at Anteater Ballpark, but was eliminated in the Regional by Virginia.

Following the 2009 season, Anteater Ballpark was renamed Cicerone Field at Anteater Ballpark for former UC Irvine chancellor Ralph J. Cicerone.
 
In 2010, the team qualified for the NCAA Tournament but was eliminated in the regional round.  In 2011, the team won the Los Angeles Regional to advance to its second super regional under Gillespie. In the super regional, the Anteaters lost to Virginia 2 games to 1.

Conference affiliations
 Independent (College Division) (1970–1973)
 Independent (Division II) (1974–1977)
 Southern California Baseball Association (1978–1984)
 Big West Conference (1985–1992, 2002–present)
 Known as the Pacific Coast Athletic Association from 1985–1986

Venues

Cicerone Field at Anteater Ballpark

Cicerone Field at Anteater Ballpark has been the program's home venue since it opened in 2002, also the year in which UC Irvine sponsored varsity baseball for the first season since 1992. The venue was known as Anteater Ballpark from 2002-2009, before it was renamed for former university chancellor Ralph J. Cicerone.  It has a capacity of 2,900 spectators.

Head coaches
Mike Gerakos, who coached for 12 seasons, is the program's longest tenured coach.

Yearly records
Below is a table of the program's yearly records.

Notable former players

Below is a list of notable former Anteaters and the seasons in which they played for the program.

 Brady Anderson (1983-1985)
 Garrett Atkins
 Dylan Axelrod (2006-2007)
 Justin Cassel (2004-2006)
 Keston Hiura (2015-2017)
 David Huff (2004)
 Doug Linton (1984-1986)
 Ben Orloff (2006-2009)
 Andre Pallante
 Bryan Petersen (2005-2007)
 Sean Tracey (2002)
 Gary Wheelock (1972-1974)

References